The 2009 NCAA Division II men's basketball tournament involved 64 schools playing in a single-elimination tournament to determine the national champion of men's NCAA Division II college basketball as a culmination of the 2008–09 basketball season. It began on March 14, 2008, and concluded as the Findlay Oilers defeated the Cal Poly Pomona Broncos 56–53 in overtime on March 28.

Regionals

Southeast – Augusta, Georgia
Location: Christenberry Fieldhouse Host: Augusta State University

South – Lakeland, Florida 
Location: Jenkins Field House Host: Florida Southern College

West – Laie, Hawaii 
Location: George Q. Cannon Activities Center Host: Brigham Young University-Hawai'i

Central – Marshall, Minnesota 
Location: R/A Facility Host: Southwest Minnesota State University

Atlantic – Erie, Pennsylvania 
Location: Hammermill Center Host: Gannon University

South Central – Warrensburg, Missouri 
Location: CMU Fieldhouse Host: Central Missouri State University

East – Brookville, New York 
Location: Pratt Recreation Center Host: Long Island University, C.W. Post Campus

Midwest – Findlay, Ohio 
Location: Houdeshell Court at Croy Gymnasium Host: University of Findlay

Elite Eight – Springfield, Massachusetts 
Location: MassMutual Center Hosts: American International College and Naismith Memorial Basketball Hall of Fame

Game summaries

Elite Eight

Final Four
Cal Poly Pomona beat Augusta State in a Final Four victory 74–70. The Jaguars were down by 11 with about 6 minutes to play, but rallied on a 14–2 run that put them ahead, 68–67. They only scored two points the rest of the game while the Broncos scored seven to win the game. They were led by Larry Gordon, who recorded 20 points and 11 rebounds.

National championship Game

In the Division II National Championship Game, top seeded Findlay Oilers played third-seeded Cal Poly Pomona Broncos. The Broncos, who had traveled 10,000 miles over the postseason, were losing to the undefeated Oilers for much of the game. Cal Poly Pomona managed to tie it at 18–18 before the Oilers went on a 12–2 run to lead by 10 at the half. Findlay widened the lead to 14 with slightly over 16 minutes left. That was the last time the Oilers scored for the next eight minutes while the Broncos recorded 13 straight points to come within one.

Walter Thompson, the point guard for the Broncos, made a three-pointer with 7:08 in regulation to tie the game at 38. They snatched the lead on the next possession at 41–40. Cal Poly Pomona center Tobias Jahn added a point on his two free throws for a 42–42 tie. With 1:42 left in the game, neither team managed to put points on the board. After Thompson missed a rebound on Austin Swift's attempted 3-pointer, the game went into overtime.

Throughout overtime, the lead changed several times. The game was tied at 53 with 24 seconds left on the clock. The Broncos' defense forced a held ball on Findlay with 2.4 seconds remaining, with possession to Findlay. On the inbounds play, Tyler Evans hit a three-pointer at the buzzer—his only three of the game—sealing the Oilers' victory by a score of 56–53.

All-tournament team
 Josh Bostic (Findlay)
 Larry Gordon (Cal Poly-Pomona)
 Morgan Lewis (Findlay)
 Walter Thompson (Cal Poly-Pomona)
 Sanijay Watts (Central Missouri)

References
 2009 NCAA Division II men's basketball tournament jonfmorse.com

Sources
 
 2010 NCAA Men's Basketball Championship Tournament Records and Statistics: Division II men's basketball Championship

NCAA Division II men's basketball tournament
Tournament
NCAA Division II basketball tournament
NCAA Division II basketball tournament